The  or  (Dutch), meaning "Law Street", is a major street running through central and eastern Brussels, Belgium, which is famous due to the presence of several notable Belgian and European Union (EU) governmental buildings. The road runs from the Rue Royale/Koningsstraat, in central Brussels, to the Robert Schuman Roundabout in its European Quarter. It forms the first (westerly) part of the N3 road that runs to Aachen, Germany.

It is also where the Council of Ministers holds its meetings.

At the far end, next to the Schuman Roundabout, are the Berlaymont building of the European Commission, the Europa building of the European Council and Council of the European Union, and the Parc du Cinquantenaire/Jubelpark beyond that. Shortly before the roundabout is the exit ramp from the tunnel under the roundabout and Cinquantenaire.

Buildings

The street starts as a continuation of the / at the crossroads with the Rue Royale/Koningsstraat. Immediately to the south is Parc/Park metro station and Brussels Park. To the north is the Belgian Parliament building; the Palace of the Nation. The Royal Park Theatre is also situated there.

 No. 10: Office of the president of the Belgian Federal Chamber of Representatives
 No. 16 (north): Official seat of the Prime Minister of Belgium, colloquially called Law Street 16
 ~ / (Small Ring) and Arts-Loi/Kunst-Wet metro station (lines 1, 2, 5 and 6)
 No. 41 (south): European Commission (DEVCO)
 No. 44 (north): Touring Club Royal de Belgique
 No. 56 (north): European Commission
 ~ No. 2 / (north): European Commission
 ~ No. 3 / (north): European Commission
 No. 86 (north): European Commission
 No. 71 (south): Thon Hotel
 No. 89: CD&V headquarters (largest Belgian political party between 1945 and 2010)
 No. 102 (north): European Commission
 No. 130 (north): European Commission
 ~ Maelbeek/Maalbeek metro station (lines 1 and 5)
 ~ /
 ~ (north) Jardin du Maelbeek/Maalbeektuin
 No. 145 (south): Lex building, offices of the Council of the European Union
 No. 170 (north): Charlemagne building, foreign affairs departments of the European Commission
 ~ Schuman station (heavy rail)
 No. 155 (south): Europa building, headquarters of the European Council and Council of the European Union
 ~ Belliard tunnel exit
 No. 200 (north): Berlaymont building, headquarters of the European Commission
 No. 175 (south): Justus Lipsius building, office space for the Council Secretariat and used for low-level Council meetings.
 ~ Schuman station (metro, lines 1 and 5)
 ~ Robert Schuman Roundabout

History
The road was redeveloped into a higher capacity one-way thoroughfare in 1969 with the first metro line being built under it, along with two decks of underground parking between the metro line and the road. In 2001, it was proposed that one of the five traffic lanes should be removed and the pavements widened to include cyclepaths. This, together with an overall facelift, was completed on 7 September 2003. Immediately, there were calls for the reversal of traffic flow (see redevelopment below).

Redevelopment

As part of plans to improve the image of the European Quarter, the eastern part of the Rue de la Loi (between the Small Ring and the Chaussée d'Etterbeek) will be rebuilt. In April 2008, the Brussels-Capital Region (the regional authority), together with the European Commission and the City of Brussels (the local authority) launched an international urban design competition to redevelop the area as an eco-district, concentrating on improving pedestrian and public transport access. They stated it should include more public spaces and have a "strong symbolic identity" with high environmental and architectural standards.

In March 2009, a French-Belgian-British team led by the French architect Christian de Portzamparc won the competition, and European Commissioner for Administrative Affairs, Audit and Anti-Fraud, Siim Kallas, stated that the project, which would be put into action gradually rather than all at once, would create a "symbolic area for the EU institutions" giving "body and soul to the European political project" and providing the Commission with extra office space. The road would be reduced from four lanes to two, and be returned to two-way traffic (rather than all west-bound) and the architects proposed a tram line to run down the centre. A series of high-rise buildings would be built on either side with three 'flagship' skyscrapers at the east end on the north side. Then Brussels Minister-President, Charles Picqué, described the towers as "iconic buildings that will be among the highest in Brussels" and that "building higher allows you to turn closed blocks into open spaces." The tallest towers at the eastern end would be subject to a separate architectural competition and would be symbolic of the Commission. The freed-up space (some ) would be given over to housing, shops, services and open spaces to give the area a more "human" feel. A sixth European School may also be built. On the western edge of the quarter, on the Small Ring, there would be "gates to Europe" to add visual impact.

The general quarter master plan saw not only the road being reduced from four lanes to two, but the tunnel's entrance being covered as far as the Résidence Palace, as well as the construction of a new square between the / and the /.

See also
 List of streets in Brussels
 Rue Belliard/Belliardstraat, a street running parallel to the Rue de la Loi
 History of Brussels
 Belgium in "the long nineteenth century"

References

Footnotes

Notes

External links

 European Commission
 Council of the European Union
 Federal Parliament of Belgium
 Pictures of Rue de la Loi

Loirue
City of Brussels
European quarter of Brussels